Richard Allen Coggins (born December 7, 1950) is a former outfielder for the Baltimore Orioles (-), Montreal Expos, New York Yankees (-) and Chicago White Sox.

Coggins helped the Orioles win the 1973 and 1974 American League Eastern Division . He finished sixth in voting for 1973 American League Rookie of the Year. He was traded along with Dave McNally and minor-league right-handed pitcher Bill Kirkpatrick from the Orioles to the Expos for Ken Singleton and Mike Torrez at the Winter Meetings on December 4, .

In five seasons he played in 342 games and had 1,083 at bats, 125 runs, 287 hits, 42 doubles, 13 triples, 12 home runs, 90 RBI, 50 stolen bases, 72 walks, .265 batting average, .312 on-base percentage, .361 slugging percentage, 391 total bases, 26 sacrifice hits, 5 sacrifice flies and 5 intentional walks. Defensively, he compiled a .986 fielding percentage at all three outfield positions.

References

External links

Rich Coggins at Baseball Almanac
Rich Coggins at Rich Coggins - BaseballBiography.com

1950 births
Living people
Aberdeen Pheasants players
African-American baseball players
American expatriate baseball players in Canada
Baseball players from Indiana
Baltimore Orioles players
Chicago White Sox players
Dallas–Fort Worth Spurs players
Major League Baseball outfielders
Miami Marlins (FSL) players
Montreal Expos players
New York Yankees players
Oklahoma City 89ers players
Rochester Red Wings players
Stockton Ports players
21st-century African-American people
20th-century African-American sportspeople